Mario Barravecchia (born 16 November 1976), or simply Mario, is an Italo-Belgian who was the finalist of the first edition of French TV reality show Star Academy. His first single "On se ressemble", was a hit in France and Belgium.

Discography

Albums
 2002 : Mario Barravecchia - #12 in Belgium, #70 in France
 2009 : Intimo

Singles
 2002 : "On se ressemble" (released under the name Mario) - #1 in Belgium, #6 in France
 2003 : "De tes propres ailes" - #65 in France
 2003 : "(Dimmi) Cosa ne sai" (duet with Lydia Castorina) - #46 in France
 2004 : "Una storia importante" - #51 in France

References

External links

1976 births
Living people
People from Saint-Nicolas, Liège
Belgian pop singers
Belgian people of Italian descent
French-language singers of Belgium
Star Academy (France) participants
21st-century Belgian male singers
21st-century Belgian singers